Cerro Romualdo  is a  mountain in San Luis Obispo County, California. The mountain is the fifth in a series of volcanic plugs called the Nine Sisters. Until 1964 the mountain was officially known as Romualdo Peak.

The mountain is named for a Chumash man who received the  Rancho Huerta de Romualdo Mexican land grant from Pío Pico, the last Mexican Governor of Alta California. Huerta de Romualdo means Romualdo's kitchen garden or orchard in Spanish. He sold the land to Captain John Wilson in 1846.

In the 1890s, rock from Cerro Romualdo was used in the construction of the Southern Pacific Railroad.

Cerro Romualdo is owned by the State of California, and is used by the California National Guard at adjacent Camp San Luis Obispo for fitness training.

References

Nine Sisters
Mountains of California
Volcanic plugs of California
Landforms of San Luis Obispo County, California